Dentalion is a genus of Neotropical hymenopteran insects of the family Eulophidae.

Species
 Dentalion alveum Hansson, 2011
 Dentalion ambonatum Hansson, 2011
 Dentalion apertum Hansson, 2011
 Dentalion apon Hansson, 2011
 Dentalion crassicornis Hansson, 2011
 Dentalion jimenezi Hansson, 2011
 Dentalion mischum Hansson, 2011
 Dentalion noyesi Hansson, 2011
 Dentalion pinguicornis Hansson, 2011
 Dentalion pnigaliae Hansson, 2011
 Dentalion quadrifer Hansson, 2011

References

Eulophidae